Ecoporanga is a municipality located in the Brazilian state of Espírito Santo. Its population was 22,835 (2020) and its area is 2,285 km². It is located in north Espírito Santo near Bahia and Minas Gerais.

References

Municipalities in Espírito Santo